The 2008 Texas A&M Aggies women's soccer team represented Texas A&M University in the 2008 NCAA Division I women's college soccer season. The Aggies were led by G. Guerrieri, who has coached the team since the program's inception in 1993 (16 years).

The Aggies finished the season 18–5–1 and advanced to the Elite 8 of the 2008 NCAA tournament before falling to North Carolina 2–1 in 2OT in Chapel Hill, NC.

The 2008 team had 28 roster players, with 14 scholarships to utilize between them.

Schedule

Lineup and formation
4–4–2 was utilized for most of the season
Mouseover names for stats

Roster and statistics
Starters highlighted in green

Season summary

Non-conference

Conference

NCAA tournament

Accolades
 Texas A&M made its 14th straight NCAA tournament appearance.
 Texas A&M was awarded one of four #3 seeds in the NCAA tournament.
 Texas A&M reached the Elite 8 round of the NCAA tournament for the 4th time.
 Texas A&M finished the season ranked #7, tied for the 3rd best finish in program history.
 Texas A&M averaged 3,176 fans per game at the Aggie Soccer Stadium, which set a school record and finished #2 nationally.

References

External links

Official website

Texas A&M Aggies women's soccer seasons
Texas AandM